Countess Ottilie of Nassau-Siegen (before or on 18 April 1437 – July 1493), official titles: Gräfin zu Nassau, Vianden und Diez, was a countess from the House of Nassau-Siegen, a cadet branch of the Ottonian Line of the House of Nassau, and through marriage respectively Countess of Katzenelnbogen and Countess of Tierstein.

Biography
Ottilie was born before or on 18 April 1437, possibly in Breda, as the only daughter of Count Henry II of Nassau-Siegen and his first wife Countess Genoveva of Virneburg.

Ottilie married in 1449/1450 to Count Philip ‘the Younger’ of Katzenelnbogen (1427 – 27 February 1453), the eldest son of Count Philip ‘the Elder’ of Katzenelnbogen and his first wife Countess Anne of Württemberg.

Following the death of her father in 1451, Ottilie claimed his part of the County of Diez as her inheritance. This led to a conflict with her paternal uncle Count John IV of Nassau-Siegen, who had succeeded his brother in all his possessions and was granted the County of Diez as a fief by Archbishop  of Trier on 4 November 1451. The conflict was complicated further due to the fact that another part of the County of Diez belonged to Ottilie’s father-in-law Philip ‘the Elder’ of Katzenelnbogen. Ottilie reached an agreement with her uncle regarding their inheritance in 1454.

Ottilie remarried on 3 June 1475 to Count Oswald I of Tierstein ( – before 1488). Oswald had succeeded his father as Count of Tierstein in 1455. He was also governor in the Alsace, the Sundgau and the Breisgau and councillor in Lorraine and the Electorate of Cologne.

In 1479 Count Philip ‘the Elder’ of Katzenelnbogen died without male issue. He was succeeded by his daughter Anne and her husband Landgrave Henry III ‘the Rich’ of Hesse-Marburg. Ottilie’s daughter, Ottilie of Katzenelnbogen, however, also immediately laid claim to the County of Katzenelnbogen. On 6 May 1482 Ottilie of Katzenelnbogen renounced her claims to the counties Katzenelbogen and Diez and received a financial compensation.

In 1481 Ottilie’s first cousin Count John V of Nassau-Siegen fully succeeded in enforcing the still unfinished settlement of Ottilie’s claims to the County of Diez. In 1485 Ottilie’s second husband, Oswald I of Tierstein, attempted to murder John V of Nassau-Siegen because of his dissatisfaction with the marriage grant and the settlement of the inheritance. The Rentmeister of Siegen, Heinrich Weiß, was able to prevent the attempt. The settlement was finally confirmed in 1510.

Ottilie died in July 1493.

Issue

First marriage
From Ottilie’s first marriage to Count Philip ‘the Younger’ of Katzenelnbogen only one daughter was born:
 Ottilie of Katzenelnbogen ( – Baden-Baden, 15 August 1517), married in Koblenz on 19 December 1468 to Margave Christopher I of Baden (13 November 1453 – Hohenbaden Castle, 19 April 1527).
The wedding of Ottilie and Christopher was a double wedding, as on the same day and location Christopher’s sister  married Count Engelbert II ‘the Illustrious’ of Nassau-Breda, the eldest son of Count John IV of Nassau-Siegen.

Second marriage
From Ottilie’s second marriage to Count Oswald I of Tierstein the following children were born:
 Count Henry (d. 30 November 1519), married Marguerite de Neuchâtel (d. after 5 December 1533).
 Count Oswald II (d. 27 August 1512), married Elisabeth of Löwenstein (d. after 1510).

Ancestors

Literature

Notes

References

Sources
 
 
 
 
 
 
 
 
  (1882). Het vorstenhuis Oranje-Nassau. Van de vroegste tijden tot heden (in Dutch). Leiden: A.W. Sijthoff/Utrecht: J.L. Beijers.

External links
 Hessen - Grafen von Katzenelnbogen. In: Medieval Lands. A prosopography of medieval European noble and royal families, by Charles Cawley.
 Nassau. In: Medieval Lands. A prosopography of medieval European noble and royal families, by Charles Cawley.
 Nassau Part 4. In: An Online Gotha, by Paul Theroff.
 Swabia - Grafen von Thierstein. In: Medieval Lands. A prosopography of medieval European noble and royal families, by Charles Cawley.

1437 births
1493 deaths
Ottilie of Nassau-Siegen
Ottilie of Nassau-Siegen
15th-century German women